The 2012 gubernatorial election in the Mexican state of Guanajuato was held on Sunday, July 1, 2012. Incumbent Guanajuato Governor Juan Manuel Oliva of the National Action Party (PAN) is retiring due to mandatory term limits, which limit all Mexican state governors to one, six-year term in office. The Guanajuato gubernatorial election coincided with the 2012 Mexican presidential and general elections.

Miguel Márquez Márquez of PAN won the election. He was sworn into office on September 26, 2012.

Gubernatorial candidates

References

2012 elections in Mexico
Guanajuato
Gubernatorial
July 2012 events in Mexico